Stegeman may refer to:
Herman Stegeman (1891–1939), American football coach
John Stegeman (born 1976), Dutch football forward and manager 
Stegeman Coliseum, a multipurpose arena in Athens, Georgia, named after Herman Stegeman

See also
 Stegemann (disambiguation)
 Philip Steegman (1903–1952), American portrait painter, sculptor, writer and illustrator

Dutch-language surnames